Eleuterio Quintanilla Prieto (24 October 1886 Gijon, Spain – 18 January 1966 Bordeaux, France) was an Asturian/Spanish anarchist and freemason, educator and pupil of Francisco Ferrer Guardia. Quintanilla was a central member of the CNT and lived in Spain until the end of the Spanish Civil War, when he went into exile in France where he died.

Biography

Youth 
Eleuterio Quintanilla Prieto was born on 24 October 1884 in Gijón, Spain. Quintanilla study at a public primary school, receiving high grades and finished his education early. At age thirteen, he began his first job as an apprentice chocolatier. During his apprenticeship, he continued his studies at a workers' college and took private lessons from an anarchist who served as Quintanilla's grammar teacher. In 1903, Quintanilla met Ricardo Mella at a conference, and Quintanilla would later claim this meeting had a major impact on his interests in anarchism. In 1904, he began to be interested in linguistics.

Militancy 
In 1904, Quintanilla began working as an orator in Gijón. The first rally in which he participated was in 1905 in Mieres. That same year, he began working for the working-class newspaper, Tiempos Nuevos. Quintanilla also began writing for numerous publications, including: Tribuna Libre , Acción Libertaria, El Libertario, and Solidaridad Obrera, eventually receiving his own column in Solidaridad Obrera. In 1909, he participated in numerous rallies, and was imprisoned in July of that year during the Tragic Week of Barcelona. In 1910, Quintanilla began constructing a town house in Gijón, and when finished, he used this as a base of operations for his advocacy. That same year, he founded the weekly newspaper Acción Libertaria alongside Ricardo Mella, sometimes they would publish it under the name of El Libertario to bypass government censorship. In 1910 and 1911, Gijón saw an increased number of strikes and lockout protests; with some of these protests resulting in a series of attacks and the arrests of employers, their employees, and protesters alike. Whilst being arrested, Quintanilla and Pedro Sierra, were injured by police, leaving both unconscious. Pablo Iglesias, Melquíades Álvarez, and Gumersindo de Azcárate protested against Quintanilla and Sierra's treatment in front of the Canalejas government. In 1910, the National Confederation of Labor was formed, with Quintanilla founding the Gijón section. CNT was then outlawed by the Spanish government the following year.

In 1914, Quintanilla abandoned his profession as a chocolatier to dedicate himself exclusively to teaching. He worked at a neutral school in Gijón, with José Luis García Rúa as a student. At the beginning of World War I, Quintanilla and Mella both declared themselves as supporters of the allies; this went against contemporary anarchists Peter Kropotkin, Jean Grave, and the official position of the CNT who all remained neutral. This conflict led to a series of debates between the anarchist newspapers Tierra y Libertad and Acción Libertaria. In 1915, Quintanilla participated in the Congress for the Peace of Ferrol, successfully relaunching CNT. In April 1916, he participated in a trade union congress in Gijón, where he proposed the union between the CNT and the trade union UGT. Only 10 July 1917, Quintanilla joined the Freemasons, Jovellanos lodge n. 337, adopting the pseudonym "Floreal". During the 1917 Spanish general strike, Quintanilla called for unity of action, calling on the UGT and Spanish Republican bodies to work together. In 1918, he attended a meeting of anarchist groups in Barcelona, ​​in this meeting he further defended the integration and cooperation between different trade unions.

That same year, he attended the 3rd National Congress of the CNT in Madrid. Here, he advocate that CNT push towards the UGT merger, the creation of industry federations, and the distancing from the Communist International. None of his proposals received sufficient support in the congress, with only a pact of collaboration between CNT and UGT precipitating. In 1920, Quintanilla denounced the collaboration pact that the UGT and the CNT had signed during the 3rd National Congress. Quintanilla's protests, seemingly in opposition to his previous claims, claimed that CNT had not upheld their end of the agreement, were becoming more opposed to collaboration with socialist unions, and that the CNT had 'abused' other collaborators.

Until 1925, Quintanilla distanced himself from trade union activity. Following Primo de Rivera becoming dictator of Spain, Quintanilla returned to participating in CNT, participating in debates if CNT should seek to aim to become legalized or remain as an underground entity. Quintanilla took the legalistic stance, and was noted to hold substantial influence over Segundo Blanco, secretary of the national committee. Despite his efforts, CNT remained underground.

Republic, civil war, exile, and death 
When the Spanish Second Republic formed, Quintanilla continued to distance himself from CNT. Quintanilla no longer assumed positions, attended meetings, or collaborated with anarchist press. Quintanilla did write sporadically for opposition unions to CNT, defending CNT's unity as a whole but still argued in favor of the split that formed between UGT and CNT, after1920. On 24 July 1931, in an interview with El Noroeste, Quintanilla lamented about his desires for a Bolshevik-style revolution in Spain, but commented that the prospect was "remote". In 1933, Quintanilla was expelled from the Freemason lodge due to an ongoing anarchist campaign against the masons and because the Iberian Anarchist Federation (Which Quintanilla was a member of) had declared the incompatibility between themselves and the masons.

Quintanilla was in Gijón when the Spanish Civil War began, serving as member of the 'suppy committee in the city. During the war, Quintanilla worked as a professor of philosophy. Quintanilla was later assigned to the protection of the " artistic treasures of Asturias and Santander", a position that Segundo Blanco would eventually take over. In 1937, he requested to be reincorporated to the Freemasons. Following his tenure in protecting artwork, Quintanilla served as the president of the National Council of Evacuated Children, eventually leaving Spain with a group of children and going into exile. During his exile, he and the children he accompanied would be incorporated into companies hiring foreign workers. He would then spend the rest of his life in Bordeaux, dying on 18 January 1966.

References

Bibliography

External links
Francisco Ferrer Collection

1886 births
1966 deaths
Confederación Nacional del Trabajo members
People from Gijón
Spanish anarchists
Spanish expatriates in France